{{DISPLAYTITLE:C17H21NO3}}
The molecular formula C17H21NO3 (molar mass: 287.35 g/mol) may refer to:

 Dihydromorphine
 Etodolac
 Galantamine
 Mesembrenone
 Ritodrine
 Thesinine

Molecular formulas